Innes McCartney (born 1964) is a British nautical archaeologist and historian. He is a Visiting Fellow at Bournemouth University in the UK.

Career
McCartney is a nautical archaeologist specializing in the interaction of shipwreck archaeology with the historical record.

In the same year he led expeditions to identify some of the U-boats sunk during Operation Deadlight. Fourteen U-boats were surveyed and several new sites discovered.

This proved that even at 60 metres' depth, war graves of this type can be identified by divers without the need to scavenge parts from them. This featured in the Channel 4 series Wreck Detectives.

In 2006 he featured in the documentary "U-boat Death-Trap" which followed his search for the identity of three mystery U-boats off the north coast of Cornwall. In the same year he discovered the German auxiliary raider HSK Komet in the English Channel. At the time, it was the only known example of this type of warship anywhere in the world.

In 2012 McCartney worked alongside wreck hunter David Mearns on an archaeological investigation of the wreck of HMS Hood, sunk in 1941. This project was supported by philanthropist Paul Allen aboard his yacht Octopus. The expedition findings were featured in the Channel Four documentary "How the Bismarck sank HMS Hood".

2014 saw publication of "The Maritime Archaeology of a Modern Conflict: Comparing the archaeology of German submarine wrecks to the historical text". It shows the extent to which historical sources relating U-boat losses in UK waters in both world wars differ from the actual distribution of the known and identified wrecks. Over 40% of those investigated had no historical precedent. The accuracy of the historic text fell as low as 36% during 1945.

In 2015 and 2016 McCartney worked as archaeological advisor to the Sea War Museum Jutland on detailed archaeological shipwreck surveys to locate all of the heretofore undiscovered wrecks of the Battle of Jutland. This was published in "Jutland 1916: The Archaeology of a Naval Battlefield"  for which he was awarded the 2016 Anderson Medal by the Society for Nautical Research.

The British submarine HMS Tarpon was also located during the North Sea surveys in 2016.

In 2016 he helped Scottish Power identify a World War I UB-III Class U-boat off the Wigtownshire coast which was found during the seabed survey for an undersea power cable between England and Scotland.

In 2017 he assisted the Sea War Museum Jutland, in a detailed survey of the Scapa Flow naval anchorages. The results were published in May 2019 in "SCAPA 1919: The Archaeology of a Scuttled Fleet".

In May 2020 it was announced that the wreck of the landing craft LCT 326 had been found off Bardsey Island during surveys by Bangor University, in collaboration with McCartney. The wreck is located over 100 nautical miles from its supposed loss position. In September 2021 as part of the same project, it was announced that the minesweeper HMS Mercury had been found in the Irish Sea. It sank in 1940 during sweeping operations.

In September 2022 it was announced that the wreck of the liner SS Mesaba had been identified by McCartney in the Irish Sea during surveys by Bangor University. SS Mesaba was sunk by German submarine  on 1 September 1918. SS Mesaba, LCT 326 and HMS Mercury are examples of the 273 shipwrecks surveyed by Bangor University and assessed by McCartney in a Leverhulme Trust funded research project, published as a single-authored monograph "ECHOES FROM THE DEEP". The project led to the naming of 87% of the wrecks surveyed.

Honours
 The Anderson Medal of the Society for Nautical Research (UK, 2016) awarded for 
 D.K. Brown Memorial Lecture of the World Ship Society (UK, 2016)
 Reg Vallintine Achievement Award of the Historical Diving Society (UK, 2014) awarded for

Selected bibliography

References 

1964 births
Alumni of Bournemouth University
Alumni of Keele University
Alumni of the University of Exeter
English television personalities
English underwater divers
Living people
Underwater archaeologists
Underwater photographers